Barleria siamensis, the Siamese barleria, is a plant in the family Acanthaceae. It occurs in southern Asia.

References

External links
Barleria siamensis Craib, hortipedia

siamensis
Plants described in 1911
Taxa named by William Grant Craib